Bryan Hodgson (born 1987) is an American college basketball coach who is currently serving as an assistant coach for the Alabama Crimson Tide.

Early life
Hodgson was born at Olean General Hospital in 1987 to a teenage mother. After his mother's boyfriend placed him on top of a wood stove when he was only a year old, Hodgson was placed in foster care. He was adopted by Larry and Rebecca Hodgson. Raised as a part of a large family in the Western New York communities of Bolivar and then later Jamestown, he graduated from Jamestown High School where he was a member of the Red Raider varsity basketball team.

College career
Hodgson played collegiately at Jamestown Community College, a NJCAA Region III program, where he served as team captain for two seasons before earning an associate degree in Social Studies.  Continuing his education at Fredonia State, Hodgson earned a Bachelor of Science in Sports Management.

Coaching career
Getting his coaching career started as a student assistant at the Fredonia State, Hodgson spent his summers working the basketball camp circuit where he has worked the prestigious camps at Duke, Maryland, West Virginia, Syracuse, and Michigan State.

Before joining the staff at the University at Buffalo, Hodgson spent time coaching in the NJCAA at his alma mater Jamestown CC as well as Midland College and the I-90 AAU travel team. During this time he helped many of his athletes move on to NCAA Division-I programs.

Hodgson joined head coach Nate Oats's staff at Alabama in 2019 as the lead recruiter.

Notes

References

1987 births
Living people
Junior college men's basketball coaches in the United States
Junior college men's basketball players in the United States
Basketball coaches from New York (state)
Buffalo Bulls men's basketball coaches
Alabama Crimson Tide men's basketball coaches
State University of New York at Fredonia alumni
Jamestown Community College alumni
American adoptees
Burn survivors